Philip Boampong (born 1 January 1990 in Ghana) is a Ghanaian footballer. He currently plays for the Ghana Telecom Premier League side Hearts of Oak.

Career 
Boampong moved with teammate Abdul Naza Alhassan from Maxbees FC to Wa All Stars in 2008. After one year with the Wa based club joined to Berekum Arsenal in January 2009. In August 2011, a fee was agreed with Turkish side Bucaspor and Hearts, but the deal soon fell through.  On 1 July 2012, Boampong joined Saudi Arabian side Al-Shoalah on a season-long loan.

International career 
Boampong played for U-17 Ghana national team in 2007 FIFA U-17 World Cup in Korea Republic, he played by the turnier 6 games and holds 4 yellow cards. On 19 August 2008 was first called for the Satellites, and was part of the Ghana national under-20 football team that won the 2009 FIFA U-20 World Cup in Egypt. Although he never played a single game for the Satellites.

Personal life
He is the younger brother of former Black Stars defender Dan Coleman.

Titles and honours

International
Ghana U-20
 FIFA U-20 World Cup Champion: 2009

References

External links 
EuroSport.com Profile

1990 births
Living people
Ghanaian footballers
Ghanaian expatriate footballers
Legon Cities FC players
Berekum Arsenal players
Al-Shoulla FC players
Expatriate footballers in Saudi Arabia
Association football defenders